12 Yard Productions is a British television production company. It was founded in 2001 as a joint-venture between David Young and the creative team behind the worldwide hit Weakest Link and Hat Trick Productions.

12 Yard has gone on to become one of the world's most successful entertainment format creators, producing hit formats including the BBC's long-running early evening quiz Eggheads, Saturday night BBC1 lottery formats The National Lottery: In it to Win it and Who Dares Wins!, primetime feel-good format Holding out for a Hero, Take on the Twisters and Big Star's Little Star for ITV, and Coach Trip, Celebrity Coach Trip  and Christmas Coach Trip for Channel 4.

On 5 December 2007, it was confirmed that ITV plc had acquired 12 Yard for £35 million.

Programming

Think Tank
Insert Name Here
5-Star Family Reunion
The Instant Gardener
Guess This House
Hello, Campers!
Gift Wrapped
The Guess List
Big Star's Little Star
Pressure Pad
Eggheads
Celebrity Eggheads
Revenge of the Egghead
In it to Win it
Who Dares Wins!
Coach Trip
Celebrity Coach Trip
Christmas Coach Trip 
 The Benefactor (TV Series)
Perfection
Take on the Twisters
Holding out for a Hero
Don't Blow the Inheritance!
Without Prejudice?
Brendan's Magical Mystery Tour
Top Dog Model
Sorority Girls
The Great British Village Show (BBC One, 2007)
Michael Winner's Dining Stars (ITV, 2010)
The Colour of Money
The Cabins
The Rich List
Dirty Money

References

External links

ITV (TV network)
Television production companies of the United Kingdom
Mass media companies established in 2001
Companies based in the City of Westminster